Puttabong Tea Estate  (formerly known as Tukvar Tea Estate) is a tea garden in the Darjeeling Pulbazar CD block in the Darjeeling Sadar subdivision of the Darjeeling district in the Indian state of West Bengal.

Etymology
Puttabong means a house of green leaves.

History
Puttabong Tea Estate was the first garden in the Darjeeling Himalayan hill region to be planted by the pioneering British tea planter Dr Campbell in 1852. It is now owned by Jay Shree Tea & Manufacturing Ltd.

Geography

Puttabong Tea Estate is one of the largest gardens in Darjeeling, spanning 20 km across.

Note: The map alongside presents some of the notable locations in the subdivision. All places marked in the map are linked in the larger full screen map.

Achievements
Puttabong is the first Darjeeling garden to get ISO 9002:2008 certification in manufacturing, plantation and marketing.

It was the first garden to fetch a record price of Rs. 10,001 per kg for its Antique tea.
It produces the finest Darjeeling tea appreciated by discerning buyers around the world around.

Jay Shree Tea
Incorporated in 1945, Jay Shree Tea and Manufacturing Ltd. is the third largest tea producer in the world with 22 tea estates spread across India and East Africa. Other tea estates of Jay Shree Tea in Darjeeling are: Rishihat, Sungma, North Tukvar, Singbulli and Balasun.

Workers
The garden employs 1,456 employees, who are provided with housing, healthcare and social amenities.

References

External links
 

Tea estates in Darjeeling district